D. Velampalli is a small village in Nellore District, Andhra Pradesh. D. Velampalli village consists of 80 to 100 families, with a total population of about 600.

References

Villages in Nellore district